Petri is a surname derived from Latin Petrus, and may refer to:

Surname 
 Adam Petri, Renaissance printer who founded a Basel publishing house
 Alexandra Petri, humor columnist for The Washington Post, daughter of Tom 
 Carl Adam Petri, who introduced Petri nets
 Edward P. Petri, American politician and businessman
 Egon Petri, Dutch pianist and composer
 Elio Petri, Italian director
 Ellen Petri, Belgian beauty queen
 Franziska Petri, German actress
 György Petri, Hungarian poet
 Heather Petri,  American water polo player
 Heinrich Petri, better known by his Latin name Henricus Petrus
 Johannes Petri, uncle to Adam Petri, both printers of Basel
 Julius Richard Petri, German bacteriologist, inventor of the Petri dish
 Laurentius Petri,  Swedish clergyman, first Evangelical Lutheran Archbishop of Sweden
 Luca Petri, Italian football player
 Maria Petri, English association football supporter
 Mario Petri, Italian operatic bass
 Michala Petri, Danish recorder player
 Mike Petri, American rugby player
 Olaus Petri, Swedish clergyman
 Petrus Petri, Spanish medieval architect
 Scott Petri, member of the Pennsylvania House of Representatives 
 Tom Petri, U.S. Representative for Wisconsin's 6th congressional district

See also 
 Petrey
 Petrie
 Petrie (disambiguation)
 Petry

Latin-language surnames
Italian-language surnames
Patronymic surnames
Surnames from given names